Upstairs Downstairs may refer to:

Television 
Upstairs, Downstairs (1971 TV series), a British TV series broadcast on ITV from 1971 to 1975
Upstairs Downstairs (2010 TV series), a sequel of the ITV series broadcast on the BBC from 2010

Music 
Upstairs/Downstairs, a 2007 album by The Ergs!
Upstairs Downstairs, a 2000 live album by Radio Massacre International
"Upstairs Downstairs", a 1971 TV series theme song issued as a single by Mantovani 1973
"Upstairs, Downstairs", a song by Herman's Hermits from the 1967 album Blaze

Other uses 
"Upstairs Downstairs", a maze game for the Unisys ICON

See also 
 Royal Upstairs Downstairs, a 2011 British teledocumentary
Upstairs and Downstairs, a 1959 British film starring Claudia Cardinale
 Upstairs and Downstairs (1925 film), a German film
 Nana Upstairs & Nana Downstairs, a 1973 book by Tomie dePaola